Board of Intermediate and Secondary Education, Bannu is the Intermediate Education Governmental body in Khyber Pakhtunkhwa, Pakistan. It is authorized with financial and administrative authority to organize, manage, regulate, develop and control intermediate and secondary education in general and accomplish examinations in the institutions affiliated with it. BISE Bannu came into being as a result of the bifurcation of the Peshawar Board in 1990 under the North West Frontier Province Board of Intermediate and Secondary Education Act 1990. The BISE Bannu is the responsible for control, organization and regulation of intermediate and secondary education of more than 700 educational institutions in public as well as private sector in Bannu District.

Jurisdiction 
Jurisdiction of BISE Bannu includes three districts and two agencies:
District Bannu
District Lakki Marwat
North Waziristan Agency

See also 
 List of educational boards in Pakistan
 Education in Pakistan
 Education in Khyber Pakhtunkhwa

References

External links 
 Official website of BISE Bannu

B